is an action role-playing game released for the Wii in Japan in December 2009. The game is a core product of the Tales series and was developed by Namco Tales Studio. The game was ported to the PlayStation 3 under the title  and was released in Japan in December 2010. The PlayStation 3 version was localized and released in English in 2012.

The game takes place in a world known as Ephinea and follows Asbel Lhant. During his childhood, Asbel befriends an amnesiac girl and witnesses her death. Seven years later, he is reunited with the girl who retains her amnesia.

Tales of Graces and Tales of Graces f both received positive reception in Japan. The Wii version sold over 100,000 copies while the PS3 version sold 200,000 copies during their week of release. The game was adapted into four manga collections, a novel series, and eight drama CDs. The English localization of Tales of Graces f received praise for the gameplay with mixed reviews for its presentation.

Gameplay

Tales of Graces consists primarily of two major areas: the field map and a battle screen. The field map is a realistically scaled 3D environment traversed by foot. On the field maps, various skits between the characters can be viewed. They involve animated character portraits, subtitles, and full voice acting. Skits concern anything from character development to side details. The battle screen is a 3D representation of an area, in which the player commands the characters in battles against CPU-controlled enemies.

During battle sequences, the game uses the Style Shift Linear Motion Battle System. Four characters are chosen to battle and characters not controlled by a player are controlled by artificial intelligence with instructions set by the players beforehand. The "Chain Capacity" (CC) denotes the number of skills and actions a character can perform. Usage brings the CC down and is recharged over time. During battle, the player and enemy has an "Eleth Gauge". When the Eleth Gauge is filled, the user or the enemy receive unlimited CC and become resistant to stunning. Each character has two skill systems: "Assault Artes" which are pre-determined combos and "Burst Artes" which can be mapped to specific inputs. Skill and attribute development are dependent on "Titles" and their levels. Titles are earned through story progression and completion of miscellaneous criteria during battle. Each Title has five levels which are advanced by completing battles.

Plot
The game takes place in a fictional world called Ephinea. Ephinea is divided into three countries: Windor, Strahta, and Fendel. Asbel Lhant, Hubert Lhant, and Cheria Barnes are children from Lhant, a village of Windor. One day, the three befriend an amnesiac girl from outside their village who they name Sophie. That same day, Lhant is visited by Richard, the prince of Windor, who befriends the four of them. Richard returns to Barona, Windor's capital city, and invites them to sneak into his castle via a secret passage. There, the four are mortally wounded by an unknown monster but are saved when Sophie sacrifices herself. Asbel regains consciousness in Lhant and is told about Sophie's death and Hubert's political adoption into the Oswell family to secure Asbel's future as the Lord of Lhant. Daunted over Sophie's death and the political events at home, Asbel runs away from home and enrolls in the Barona knight academy.

Seven years later, Asbel learns from Cheria that his father died defending Lhant from an invasion by Fendel. The two return to Lhant and are saved from Fendel's army by Sophie and later Hubert with the Stratha military. Hubert reveals Stratha has been ordered by Windor to secure Lhant and assumes the position of Lord after banishing Asbel from the village. Hearing rumors of Richard's death, the party investigate and find him in the castle's secret passage. Richard explains his father was killed by his uncle, Cedric, who then assumed the throne.

The three travel to meet a trusted Duke and are joined by Pascal, a prodigy from an engineering tribe known as the Amarcians. With the Duke's army, the party overthrows Cedric and Richard regains the throne.

Richard orders an invasion of Lhant to rid it of Stratha's control, forcing the party to betray him. Acknowledging Hubert's efforts as Lord of Lhant, Asbel and the party, joined by Malik Caesar, travel to Stratha to negotiate with the government to formally instate Hubert as Lord. The government agrees on the pretense that Pascal fixes Stratha's valkines, a large crystal which supplies a life sustaining energy known as eleth; Pascal succeeds but Richard appears and absorbs the valkines' eleth, and flees. The party learn Windor's valkines has also been absorbed and plan to intercept Richard at the final valkines in Fendel. Hubert joins the party as they travel to Fendel but fail to stop Richard. Deducing the Lastalia, the planet's core, is Richard's target, the party find Richard there; Richard mortally injures Sophie before sealing the entrance to the Lastalia.

The party is unable to heal Sophie with magic or medicine, so Pascal suggests the party travel to Fodra, a nearby planet that Sophie originates from, to find a cure. After finding a space shuttle left by Pascal's ancestors, the party travel to Fodra where they meet Emeraude, the last remaining human on the desolated planet. Using advanced machinery, Sophie is healed and regains her memories, revealing she is a biological humanoid engineered to defeat Lambda, the monster that attacked them in their childhood and is currently possessing Richard. Emeraude helps the party bypass the barrier on the Lastalia where they confront and defeat Richard. Emeraude betrays the party and attempts to absorb Lambda's power but dies in the process. Lambda begins to fuse with the Lastalia, causing the party to see his memories and learn about his suffering caused by humanity. The party defeats the materialized Lambda; since Lambda can not be killed by normal means, Sophie intends to sacrifice herself to kill him. Instead, Asbel absorbs and convinces Lambda to let him show humanity's worth. Lambda agrees before falling into a deep sleep.

In the after-story Lineage and Legacies, the monster population has become an epidemic, forcing Asbel and his friends to reunite and investigate the cause. Hypothesizing that the eleth from Fodra is influencing the monsters, the party travel there and discover Fodra's core has reactivated. They learn the core is sentient and wants revenge on the humans for Fodra's environmental decay. The party defeats Fodra's soldiers, the Little Queens, and have the reawakened Lambda absorb Fodra's consciousness. In doing so, Lambda returns to his deep sleep in order to dissuade Fodra's hatred. The party separates and returns to their daily life, concluding with Asbel proposing to Cheria. In the distant future, Sophie shares the story of the party's adventure with Asbel and Cheria's great-great-grandson.

Main characters

Voiced by: Takahiro Sakurai, Yuki Kaida (childhood) (Japanese); Bryce Papenbrook, Kate Higgins (childhood), (English)

Asbel is the eldest son and successor to Aston Lhant, the Lord of the village Lhant. After Sophie's death and Hubert's adoption into the Oswell family, Asbel leaves for Barona where he trains to be a knight in order to atone for his failure to protect Sophie. After the events of Tales of Graces, he assumes the position as Lord. In Lineage and Legacies, he marries Cheria and adopts Sophie into the Lhant family. Since his debut, Asbel has ranked third in the Tales character popularity polls.

Asbel is a playable character in Tales of the World: Radiant Mythology 3, Tales of the Heroes: Twin Brave and is a character class in Tales of Phantasia: Narikiri Dungeon X. He also makes a cameo in .hack//Links pre-order DVD. The game's producer, Hideo Baba, wanted Asbel's story to portray the need to conform to social guidelines and expectations as one grows up. Through Asbel's conflict on succeeding his father's Lordship or following his dreams as a Knight, Baba wanted the players to understand the importance in protecting what is important to them and to follow through with their own path and dreams.

Voiced by: Kana Hanazawa (Japanese); Cassandra Lee Morris (English)

Sophie is an amnesiac girl Asbel, Hubert, Cheria, and Richard befriend. She is seemingly killed after protecting them from Lambda. She reappears seven years later when Asbel and Cheria were in danger. Sophie is revealed to be Protos Heis, a humanoid made of tiny particles acting in concert with each other. Her death seven years ago is explained as Sophie breaking up into particles residing inside Asbel, Hubert, and Cheria to heal their wounds and is the reason the three possess mystical powers. During the events of Lineage and Legacies, Sophie expresses her fears of life after the death of her friends due to her immortality. To lessen her fears, Asbel formally adopts her into the Lhant family. After fusing with a Little Queen, Sophie ages to an adult and is able to express a greater variety of emotions. Since her debut, Sophie has ranked on the Tales character popularity polls. Sophie is a playable character in Tales of the World: Radiant Mythology 3.

Voiced by: Takahiro Mizushima, Mikako Takahashi (childhood) (Japanese); Steve Staley (English)

Hubert is Asbel's younger brother. He is fostered into the Oswell family to secure Asbel's succession to Lord. Hubert resents Asbel for deserting Lhant, perceiving the act as spiting his sacrifice, and his parents for abandoning him. He overcomes his anger when he reunites with his family seven years later. Due to his capabilities, he is appointed the lieutenant of the Strahta military. Hubert ranked on the fifth Tales character popularity poll and fell from the rankings afterwards. He makes a cameo in Tales of Hearts R dressed as the Sony mascot Kuro.

Voiced by: Shiho Kawaragi (Japanese); Laura Bailey (English)

Cheria is the granddaughter of Lhant's family butler. She was sickly as a child but is healed due to Sophie's powers. She harbors a crush on Asbel but treats him coldly after he leaves Lhant. She later reveals her sorrow in having Asbel abandon her and reconciles with him. She also becomes Asbel's wife. Since her debut, Cheria has ranked on the Tales character popularity polls. Game Informer listed Cheria as one of the best characters in the Tales series. Cheria is a playable character in Tales of the World: Radiant Mythology 3 and Tales of the Heroes: Twin Brave.

Voiced by: Daisuke Namikawa, Yuko Sanpei (childhood); David Vincent, Wendee Lee (childhood) (English)

Richard is the prince of Windor who befriends Asbel and Sophie after his visit to Lhant. Before meeting Asbel, Richard has a strong distrust in others due to others using his status for their own gain and his uncle Cedric's attempts to murder him. When Cedric poisoned and left him to die in the underground passage, Lambda saves his life by fusing with him. Seven years later, Lambda's influence causes Richard to become violent and urges him to destroy humanity by fusing with the Lastalia. After separating from Lambda, Richard is determined to atone for his crimes which causes his popularity to soar in all three countries. Since his debut, Richard has ranked on the Tales character popularity polls.

Voiced by: Hiroki Tochi (Japanese); Jamison Price (English)

Malik is Asbel's instructor at the knight academy. His maturity and gentlemanly demeanor makes him popular with women. In the past, he was a revolutionist of Fendel who wanted more for the lower class. After the events of the game, Malik becomes Fendel's ambassador. He is voiced by Hiroki Touchi. Malik ranked on the fifth Tales character popularity poll and fell from the rankings since then. He makes a cameo in .hack//Link's pre-order DVD.

Voiced by: Kana Ueda (Japanese); Kate Higgins (English)

Pascal is an Amarcian prodigy, a tribe of engineers. She has a hyperactive personality and is fascinated in mysterious technology and in Sophie's origins. Since her debut, Pascal has ranked on the Tales character popularity polls. She makes a cameo in Tales of Hearts R dressed as the Sony mascot Toro Inoue.

Voiced by: Shigeru Nakahara (Japanese); Keith Silverstein (English)

Lambda is an advanced lifeform created on Fodra. His mistreatment by humans fueled his hatred towards them. During the party's childhood, he resides inside Richard after he was injured by Sophie and as a result, saved Richard's life. Seven years later, Lambda is reawakened when Richard receives a fatal wound. Lambda empowers Richard and manipulates him to achieve his goals of destroying humanity. After he is defeated by the party, Lambda is absorbed by Asbel who convinces him to give humans a chance. In Lineage and Legacies, he absorbs Fodra's consciousness to dissuade her hatred as Asbel did for him.

Fodra is a sentient desolated planet. Fodra's scientists were able to shut down Fodra's core and relocate the surviving humans to Ephinea. In Lineage and Legacies, Fodra is reactivated and resumes its genocide. It is confronted by the party, forcing it to merge the remaining Little Queens to form  which is defeated by the party. Fodra's consciousness is then absorbed by Lambda who intends to dissuade its hatred. As the last Little Queen nears death, Sophie accepts her request to merge and watch over Fodra.

Development and release
On July 7, 2008, Namco Bandai Games announced the next core product of the Tales series is developed for the Wii. A trailer for the game was shown in October 2008 during the Nintendo Autumn 2008 Conference. During Jump Festa 2009, the game was given the code name  and is revealed to have been in development for the past two years. In the first week of April's Weekly Shōnen Jump, the game's name was revealed to be Tales of Graces; the name was trademarked by Namco Bandai Games a month prior. That same week, the developers were revealed to the same developers from Tales of Destiny. In the same month, the game's theme was revealed to be . During the September Tokyo Game Show, the game's theme song was revealed to be Mamoritai (White Wishes) by BoA, which marks the second time a theme song in the Tales series has had both an English version and a Japanese version. The game was released on December 10, 2009, and was also available as a bundle with a new Wii system. The game included , a minigame for the Nintendo DS. Kamenin Merchant! was released for the Nintendo DSi on December 2, 2009. To promote the game, Namco Bandai Games and House Foods collaborated on packaged mabo curry. In March 2010, Namco Bandai Games began to recall Tales of Graces due to software bugs. Namco allowed customers to exchange their game with an updated version until July 2011.

The PlayStation 3 port, Tales of Graces f, was first revealed on July 28, 2010's Weekly Shonen Jump and officially announced by Namco on August 2, 2010. The producer, Hideo Baba, explained the port was decided in February 2010 due to fan demand. The port adds an "Accelerate Mode" to the gameplay and an after-story entitled Lineage & Legacies. Preorderers received a DVD which contains a video of the game's protagonists meeting with characters from Tales of Destiny 2. A demo was released on October 7, 2010, and the game was released on December 2, 2010. A limited edition of the game included a letter set. Namco and House Foods restarted the packaged mabo curry to promote the game. Tales of Graces f was later re-released with a 15th anniversary cover art edition on August 4, 2011, and with PlayStation 3 The Best label on August 2, 2012.

A North American localization was hinted on Namco Bandai Games' Facebook page by a puzzle on January 24, 2011. When solved, the puzzle reveals a URL to a distorted image which was restored on February 2, 2011, and reveals Tales of Graces fs localization for North America. On May 11, 2011, Namco officially announced the North American, EMEA and Asia-Pacific localization of Tales of Graces f. The text was translated by 8-4 while Cup of Tea Productions produced the dubbing. The North American localization was released on March 13, 2012. The EMEA and Asia-Pacific localization released on August 31, 2012, along with a day one special edition. The game was made available on the North American and European PlayStation Network in March 2013.

Downloadable content
Tales of Graces offers costumes for the playable characters as downloadable content. Pre-orderers received codes which give Asbel, Sophie, and Cheria costumes from Tales of Vesperia. Costumes based on The Idolmaster Dearly Stars for Sophie, Cheria, and Pascal were released on December 16, 2009. On December 23, 2009, a Hatsune Miku costume for Sophie and a suit set for Asbel, Hubert, and Malik were released. Between January and March 2010, a set of unique costumes designed by Mutsumi Inomata were released for each character. In addition to the costumes, challenge battles were also added as downloadable content.

Tales of Graces f received similar content as its Wii predecessor. Pre-orderers received a code which gives Asbel, Sophie, and Richard costumes from Tales of Destiny 2. On the release date, Code Geass costumes, a Toro costume for Pascal, and Sophie's Hatsune Miku costume were made available to download. On December 9, 2010, the Idolmaster set, suit set, school uniform set, and a Haseo costume for Asbel were released. The unique costumes designed by Inomata were released on December 22, 2010. In January 2011, various costumes were released to make the characters resemble other characters from the Tales series.

In North America, all Tales of Graces fs DLC, excluding cameo costumes from other franchises, was localized and released between March 13, 2012, and April 10, 2012. Europe received the same DLC which were released between August 29, 2012, and September 26, 2012. For the Tales of Destiny 2 preorder costumes, North American preorders from GameStop received a code for them; in Europe, the code was included with the day one special edition.

Media adaptions

Manga
Tales of Graces spawned four manga adaptations after its release: Three anthology collections, and a traditional manga series. The first anthology collection,  consists of three volumes by Ichijinsha. The second anthology collection, consists of a single volume by Ichijinsha and was released on March 25, 2011. The individual chapters were then collected and released in a single volume on November 27, 2012, under the Dengeki Comics imprint. It began serialization in Viva Tales of Magazine beginning in its Volume 2, 2011 issue and is currently ongoing. ASCII Media Works collected the chapters and released the first volume on October 27, 2011.

Books
Tales of Graces spun off a novel series titled . The first volume is subtitled  and the second . They were released by Enterbrain in February and May 2011.  by Namco Bandai Games was released by Yamashita Books on June 4, 2012. It details the game's plot and fictional world. Tales of Graces has received six strategy guides in total: three for the Wii and three for the PS3. Shueisha, Namco Bandai Games, and Enterbrain were the publishers.

Audio CDs
Ten drama CDs, produced by Frontier Works, and an original soundtrack by Avex Group were created based on the game.  1 to 4 are side stories that take place during the game's plot. They were released between May 26, 2010, and August 25, 2010. It ranked 128th on Oricon's charts.

Reception

Tales of Graces sold 113,000 copies on its initial launch date, and sales reached 216,000 within its first year. The game was re-released under the Nintendo Selects label on March 24, 2011. Famitsu praised the depth of the gameplay but criticized the loading time. The game was listed on Famitsu's "Greatest Games of All-Time" in 2010. Tales of Graces f sold over 200,000 copies in Japan during its first week and reached over 300,000 a year later. Tales of Graces f was later re-released under PlayStation 3 The Best label on August 2, 2012. Famitsu repeated their praise of the gameplay and lauded the graphical upgrades. A survey by ASCII Media Works's Dengeki Online in 2011 revealed Tales of Graces is ranked seventh on games readers would want to be adapted into an anime.

For the English localization of Tales of Graces f, critics praised the gameplay while the presentation received mixed reviews. IGN described the battle system as "a beautiful ebb and flow to each confrontation" while GameSpot considered it to be the most technical and robust system of the Tales series. Electronic Gaming Monthly and Joystiq praised the depth with the latter calling it "an actual challenge instead of mindless button-pressing". Meanwhile, Game Informer considered the combat to be simple but fun. Critics have also commented on the game's alchemy system, with IGN calling it "an approachable pursuit" and Joystiq describing it as "unwieldy" due to the number of collectibles. IGN, Game Informer, GamesRadar, and GameTrailers all criticized the backtracking needed in the game. GameInformer, GameSpot, and GameTrailers commented on the small world, with GameTrailers panning the linear pathways and "invisible walls" which prevent exploration along with the "cut and paste" dungeons.

The plot, graphics, and audio have received mixed reviews. The plot and characters have been called cliché by Game Informer, GameSpot, and GamesRadar. Game Informer called the childhood prologue monotonous but commented on the improving story after the time skip. GameSpot agreed, calling the prologue the "weakest part of the story on its own" but "crucial point of reference" which adds depth and eventually breaks away from the cliché. GamesRadar shared the same opinion as GameSpot and praised Richard's transformation into a villain. As for the graphics, IGN considered them outdated while Joystiq described it as washed-out with jerky movements. For the audio, IGN, Game Informer, and GamesRadar, considered the music underwhelming and the voice acting acceptable. IGN describes the voice acting "works" but some parts suffer from weak script. Game Informer compared the voices to a well-produced anime and GamesRadar considered them fitting for the characters. Meanwhile, GameTrailers criticized the presentation completely, citing the plot as predictable, the characters unengaging, the lightings flat, animations stiff, lipsyncing off, forgettable music, and the voice acting as dry.

Notes and references
Notes

References

Primary references

External links
 Official Tales of Graces website 
 Official Tales of Graces f website 

2009 video games
Cooperative video games
PlayStation 3 games
Role-playing video games
Action role-playing video games
Graces, Tales of
Video games developed in Japan
Video games scored by Motoi Sakuraba
Video games with downloadable content
Wii games